Municipal elections were held for the first time in Moyen-Congo on 18 November 1956. Voting took place in three municipalities; Brazzaville, Pointe-Noire and Dolisie. The Democratic Union for the Defence of African Interests won the polls in all three municipalities. Fulbert Youlou became mayor of Brazzaville.

References

1956 elections in Africa
1956 in Moyen-Congo
1956